William Davie Brown (29 May 1852 – 24 March 1876) was a Scottish international rugby union player. He played as a full back.

He played for Glasgow Academicals, one of the top teams in Scotland at the time.

He was called up to the Glasgow District side for the Great Britain's very first provincial rugby match on 23 November 1872.  He went on to captain the side in the match against Edinburgh District on 5 December 1874.

He was called up to the Scotland squad for the world's very first international rugby match in 1871. He represented Scotland 5 times in total.

References

1852 births
1876 deaths
Scottish rugby union players
Scotland international rugby union players
Rugby union players from Glasgow
History of rugby union in Scotland
Glasgow Academicals rugby union players
Glasgow District (rugby union) players
Rugby union fullbacks